Roles v. Nathan (t/a Manchester Assembly Rooms) [1963] 1 W.L.R. 1117, [1963] 2 All E.R. 908 is an occupiers' liability case in English tort law. It concerns s.2(3)(b) of the Occupiers' Liability Act 1957, which states,

"An occupier may expect that a person, in the exercise of his calling, will appreciate and guard against special risks ordinarily incident to it, so far as the occupier leaves him free to do so."

It also laid down an example of the scope of an occupier's defence when workmen are warned of some danger before they do a job at the occupier's premises. The judges in the Court of Appeal were Lord Denning MR, Harman LJ and (in dissent) Pearson LJ.

Facts
Two chimney sweeps were sealing up a sweep hole in a flue. Carbon monoxide came through. They had been warned repeatedly, and told not to stay in too long, and not to work while a fire was alight. Once already, they had been dragged out for not doing as they were told. They died while working when the fire was burning. The widows sued the occupier. The facts in Lord Denning MR's words follow.

Judgment
It was held that the warnings were enough for the occupiers to fall within the s.2(4)(a) OLA 1957 defence. Moreover, the occupier was under no duty of care, because under s.2(3)(b) the risk was incident to the workmen's calling, a danger they could have been expected to guard against. Pearson LJ dissented, but as he made clear this was on the basis of what he saw the evidence of the workers' conduct to be. He thought because the chimney sweeps had not lit the fire, and did not know of it, this danger was beyond their calling, under s.2(3)(b) and that for s.2(4)(a) the warnings were not enough, because the defendant's agent (i.e. the caretaker) had lit a fire, which produced the deadly fumes, and the warning could not change that. Lord Denning MR's judgment continues below.

After Harman LJ delivered a concurring judgment, Pearson LJ stated he could not agree with his brethren's view of the evidence, and after rehearsing the facts, he said why.

See also
Negligence

Notes

Lord Denning cases
English tort case law
1963 in British law
English occupier case law
Court of Appeal (England and Wales) cases
1963 in case law